Daniela Valkova (born 20 February 1949) is a Bulgarian hurdler. She competed in the women's 100 metres hurdles at the 1980 Summer Olympics.

References

1949 births
Living people
Athletes (track and field) at the 1980 Summer Olympics
Bulgarian female hurdlers
Olympic athletes of Bulgaria
Place of birth missing (living people)